Jan Carson is a writer from Northern Ireland. Her books include Malcolm Orange Disappears (2014), Children’s Children (2016), Postcard Stories (2017), The Fire Starters (2019) – which won the EU Prize for Literature in 2019 – and The Raptures (2021).

Born in Ballymena in 1980, Carson lives in Belfast, where she runs arts events for the elderly.

Short Stories
 A Little Unsteadily Into Light (2022, New Island Books)

References

Writers from Belfast
Living people
Date of birth missing (living people)
Year of birth missing (living people)